Andagadu is a 2005 Telugu-language comedy film, produced by Dande Srinivasa Rao under the Sri Nilaya Pictures banner and directed by Pendyala Venkata Rama Rao. It stars Rajendra Prasad and Damini, with music composed by Sri.

Plot
Sundaram is a popular jingle composer, his only problem in life is his bad looks. No girl likes him and all his marriage proposals go futile. One night, his housemaid suggests to him that there are Mohini Pisachi (sex hungry lady ghosts) roaming in the night in search of able bachelors. Since Sundaram can't get real girls, he wants to settle for a ghost. He starts performing black magic to get hold of one. Ramya accidentally bumps into his house and learns about Sundaram's fascination with ghosts. The rest of the story is all about how she seduces him.

Cast

Rajendra Prasad as Sundaram
Damini as Ramya
Chandra Mohan as Viswanatham
M. S. Narayana as Satyam
Venu Madhav as Raju
Sameer as Sujatha's brother-in-law
Junior Relangi as Comedy Wizard
Bhavana as Suvarna
Harika as Sujatha
Sudha as Sudha
Hema as Nagamani
Sana as Sujatha's sister
Subhashini as Aliveelu
Pavala Shyamala 
Banda Jyothi as C.I.

Soundtrack

Music was composed by Sri. Music was released on Music Company.

References

2005 comedy horror films
2005 films
Indian ghost films
Indian comedy horror films
2000s Telugu-language films
2005 comedy films